CKS or C.K.S. may refer to:
 Chiang Kai-shek
 The former IATA airport code for Taiwan Taoyuan International Airport (IATA: TPE), which was formerly known as Chiang Kai-shek International Airport.
CKS Group, a former American advertising company
 The ICAO code for Kalitta Air 
 Chu Kong Passenger Transport Co., Ltd (CKS), a Hong Kong ferry company
 C.K.S. (camera manufacturer) (Chiyoda Kogaku Seiko), a pre-decessor to Minolta
 Clarkston railway station, which has the National Rail code CKS.
 Checksum, which is a method for detecting errors of data transmission/storage, whose common acronym is CKS.